This is the filmography list for the Scottish-American actor, voice actor, director, producer, writer and activist Alan Cumming.

Film

Television

Theatre

Video games

References

External links
 

Male actor filmographies
British filmographies
Scottish filmographies
American filmographies